The Dora Milaje are fictional characters appearing in American comic books published by Marvel Comics. They are a team of women who serve as special forces for the fictional African nation of Wakanda.

Members of the Dora Milaje appear in the Marvel Cinematic Universe films Captain America: Civil War (2016), Black Panther (2018), Avengers: Infinity War (2018), Avengers: Endgame (2019), and Black Panther: Wakanda Forever (2022), and the Disney+ series The Falcon and the Winter Soldier and What If...? (both 2021).

Publication history
The Dora Milaje first appeared in Black Panther, vol. 3 #1 (November 1998), created by writer Christopher Priest and artist Mark Texeira. Priest however added creation credit really should go to Jimmy Palmiotti and Joe Quesada: "actually came from his Marvel Knights editors Quesada and Palmiotti who thought it would be great if the Panther had female bodyguards." The Dora Milaje share similarities with the Dahomey Amazons (Agoji), the all-female military regiment of the Kingdom of Dahomey, which was located in West Africa in what is now the Republic of Benin.

The 2017 series "World of Wakanda" written by Roxane Gay and Yona Harvey, tells the story of the couple Ayo and Aneka, two former Dora Milaje.

In the 2018 limited series Wakanda Forever, written by Nnedi Okorafor, the Dora Milaje act in team-ups with Spider-Man, the X-Men and the Avengers.

Fictional character biography

To keep peace in Wakanda, the Black Panther picked dora milaje ("adored ones") from rival tribes to serve as his personal guard and ceremonial wives-in-training.

Members
 Aneka - A former leader of the Dora Milaje. She was arrested and stripped of her rank after killing a chieftain who had been victimizing the women in her village. After escaping, she became half of the vigilante duo known as the Midnight Angels.
 Asira - The princess of the Jabari tribe.
 Ayo - Aneka's lover and another former Dora Milaje. After Aneka was arrested and sentenced to death, Ayo broke her out of prison. Using a pair of prototype armored suits, the two became the Midnight Angels.
 M'yra - A member of the Dora Milaje who lost her right arm. She was reassigned to protect Shuri.
 Nareema - A Dora Milaje member who helped Storm fight the V-Series Doombots.
 Nakia – A Wakandan Mutate with superhuman strength, speed, and agility. She is a former Dora Milaje of T'Challa.
 Okoye – A former Dora Milaje. Okoye is of the J'Kuwali tribe and acted as a traditional, proper concomitant to the king, speaking only to him and only in Hausa, an African language not widely spoken in Wakanda and thus affording the king and his wives a measure of privacy.
Queen Divine Justice – The street-smart queen of the Jabari tribe of Wakanda raised in Chicago, and former Dora Milaje of T'Challa. She originally went by the name Chanté Giovanni Brown.
 Zola - The headmistress of the Dora Milaje who trained Aneka, Ayo, and Nakia.

Collected editions

In other media

Television
 The Dora Milaje appeared in Black Panther, voiced by Alfre Woodard and Vanessa Marshall.
 Okoye, Nakia, and Divine Justice of the Dora Milaje appeared in The Avengers: Earth's Mightiest Heroes episode "Welcome to Wakanda".
 The Dora Milaje appeared in Avengers Assemble, with Aneka voiced by Erica Luttrell while the other unnamed members are voiced by Daisy Lightfoot and Debra Wilson.
 Okoye appears in Lego Marvel Super Heroes - Black Panther: Trouble in Wakanda, voiced by Yvette Nicole Brown.

Marvel Cinematic Universe

The Dora Milaje appear in live-action media set in the Marvel Cinematic Universe.
 Ayo of the Dora Milaje appears in the film Captain America: Civil War, portrayed by Florence Kasumba. 
 The Dora Milaje appear in the film Black Panther, with Okoye portrayed by Danai Gurira, Kasumba reprising her role as Ayo, the film-exclusive Xoliswa portrayed by Sydelle Noel, and Marija Abney, Janeshia Adams-Ginyard, Maria Hippolyte, Marie Mouroum, Jénel Stevens, Zola Williams, Christine Hollingsworth, and Shaunette Renée Wilson as various unnamed members. After Erik "Killmonger" Stevens takes over Wakanda and seemingly kills T'Challa, the Dora Milaje reluctantly stand by him as they must remain loyal to the throne. After T'Challa returns, the Dora Milaje fight Killmonger, though Xoliswa is killed in the process.
 In the film Avengers: Infinity War, the Dora Milaje join the Avengers in defending Wakanda from Thanos's forces.
 In the film Avengers: Endgame, the Dora Milaje join the Avengers in their fight against an alternate timeline version of Thanos.
 The Dora Milaje appear in the miniseries The Falcon and the Winter Soldier, with Kasumba reprising her role as Ayo from the films, while series exclusive characters Nomble and Yama are portrayed by Janeshia Adams-Ginyard and Zola Williams respectively. After Bucky Barnes breaks Helmut Zemo out of prison, the Dora Milaje pursue the latter and eventually capture him before sending him to the Raft. Ayo advises Barnes not to return to Wakanda for some time, though he is able to ask them to create a suit for Sam Wilson.
 The Dora Milaje appear in the film Black Panther: Wakanda Forever. with Gurira and Kasumba reprising their roles of Okoye and Ayo. Following the former's failure to protect Shuri and Riri Williams, Okoye is removed from her position and replaced with Ayo.

Video games
 A member of the Dora Milaje appears in Lego Marvel's Avengers.
 The Dora Milaje appear in Marvel Ultimate Alliance 3: The Black Order.

References

External links

Black people in comics
Comics characters introduced in 1998
Fictional organizations in Marvel Comics
Fictional women soldiers and warriors
Marvel Comics female characters
Marvel Comics military personnel
Wakandans